Peter Schofield may refer to:

 Peter Schofield (Australian rules footballer) (born 1932), Australian rules footballer who played in the 1950s and 1960s
 Peter Schofield (rugby league), Australian rugby league footballer who played in the 1970s and 1980s
 Peter Schofield (physicist) (1929-2018), British physicist
 Peter Schofield (civil servant) (born 1969), British senior civil servant